Sharath Kuniyil is a goalkeeper who played for Mumbai FC and Mohammedan in the I-League. He made his debut in a 1-0 defeat by Salgaoca.

Career statistics

Club
Statistics accurate as of 11 May 2013

References

Mumbai FC players
Indian footballers
Living people
1986 births
Association football goalkeepers
Footballers from Kerala